Christophe Coué (born March 23, 1982) is a France footballer defender, who is currently contracted with Vannes OC.

Career
He has played for FC Lorient and Clermont Foot. On 1 July 2009 Stade Lavallois signed the left-back  from Clermont Foot.

References

External links
 
 Foot National Profile

1982 births
Living people
French footballers
FC Lorient players
Clermont Foot players
Vannes OC players
Ligue 2 players
Championnat National players
Association football defenders